George Sloan may refer to:

 George B. Sloan (1831–1904), American businessman, banker, and politician
 George Sloan (Canadian politician) (fl. 1930–1959), member of the Ottawa City Council
 Off-Ramp, a DC Comics character

See also
 George B. Sloan Estate, Oswego, New York